Nikita Misyulya (born 23 April 1990) is a Russian racing driver  previously competing in the World Touring Car Championship and FIA European Rallycross Championship, he made his debut in both championships in 2014.

Racing career
Misyulya began his career in 2013 in the LADA Granta Cup, winning the championship that year. In 2014 Misyulya made his World Touring Car Championship debut with Campos Racing driving a SEAT León WTCC in the Russian round of the championship. He also raced in the FIA European Rallycross Championship that year for Volland Racing, finishing second in the standings.

His racing licence was revoked by Russian Automobile Federation for the 2017 season for multiple traffic violations.

Racing record

Complete FIA European Rallycross Championship results

Super1600

Complete World Touring Car Championship results
(key) (Races in bold indicate pole position – 1 point awarded just in first race; races in italics indicate fastest lap – 1 point awarded all races; * signifies that driver led race for at least one lap – 1 point given all races)

References

External links
 Profile at motorsportstats.com
 
 Profile at Audi mediacenter
 Profile at Russian Circuit Racing Series

1990 births
Living people
Russian racing drivers
World Touring Car Championship drivers
Audi Sport TT Cup drivers
European Rallycross Championship drivers
Russian Circuit Racing Series drivers
Campos Racing drivers